Svetlogorsky (masculine), Svetlogorskaya (feminine), or Svetlogorskoye (neuter) is the name of several rural localities in Russia:
Svetlogorsky (rural locality), a settlement in Cheremshansky District of the Republic of Tatarstan
Svetlogorskoye (rural locality), a selo in Svetlogorsky Rural Okrug of Abinsky District of Krasnodar Krai